Talkhab (also Romanized as Talkhāb; also known as Talkh Āb) is a village in Hendmini Rural District, Badreh District, Darreh Shahr County, Ilam Province, Iran. In the 2006 census, its population was 786, in 156 families. The village is populated by Lurs.

References 

Populated places in Darreh Shahr County
Luri settlements in Ilam Province